Arco Iris is an album by singer Amina Alaoui. The album, Alaoui's first work for ECM, is focused on singing and features light string accompaniment along with sparse percussion. It was recorded in April 2010 in Lugano and released in 2011.  The New York Times termed the recording as "a fusion of different traditions to form her own Iberian Peninsula".  It also noted the album's references to musical traditions of Portuguese fado, Spanish flamenco, Persian and Arab-Andalusian classical music.

Track listing
"Hado"	- 1:50
"Búscate En Mí" - 6:31
"Fado Al-Mu'tamid" - 5:30
"Flor De Nieve" - 4:07
"Oh Andaluces" - 6:55
"Ya Laylo Layl" - 9:18
"Fado Menor" - 5:26
"Búscate En Mí, Var." - 5:32
"Moradía" - 3:59
"Las Morillas De Jaén" - 7:05
"Que Faré" - 4:26
"Arco Iris" - 6:34

Personnel
Amina Alaoui - vocals, daf
Saïf Alah Ben Abderrazak - violin
Eduardo Miranda - mandolin
José Luis Montón - flamenco guitar
Sofiane Negra - oud
Idriss Agnel - percussion

References

ECM Records albums
2011 albums
Albums produced by Manfred Eicher